Hypaepa is a genus of planthoppers in the family Fulgoridae, subfamily Poiocerinae. Species are distributed in Central America.

Species
 Hypaepa costata (Fabricius, 1803)
 Hypaepa diversa Distant, 1899
 Hypaepa illuminata Distant, 1887
 Hypaepa laetabilis (Walker, 1858)
 Hypaepa rosales (Lallemand, 1963)
 Hypaepa rubricata Distant, 1887
 Hypaepa rufifascia (Walker, 1851)
 Hypaepa transversalis Signoret, 1863
 Hypaepa zapotensis Distant, 1887

References

Auchenorrhyncha genera
Poiocerinae